O Manishi Katha is 2014 Telugu-language philosophical film, produced by Bala Bhai Chovatia on Om Shiv films banner and directed by Radha Swamy Avula. Starring Jagapati Babu and Kalyani, with music composed by Vijay Kurakula.

Synopsis
The film deals with the three gunas: satvika, rajas and tamas.

Plot
Ramu (Jagapati Babu) who runs a hotel in a village falls in love with Sita Mahalakshmi (Kalyani). With blessings from their parents, they get married. A person enters into their happy life and this leads to the suicide of Sita. What are the reasons for Sita committing suicide? How Ramu will take revenge to the person that caused Sita to commit suicide is the rest of the story.

Cast
Jagapati Babu as Ramu
Kalyani as Sita

Soundtrack

Music composed by Vijay Kurakula. Lyrics written by Suddala Ashok Teja. Music released on ADITYA Music Company.

References

External links
review
2010s Telugu-language films
Indian drama films